Bionicle 3: Web of Shadows is a 2005 computer-animated science fantasy action film based on the Bionicle toy line by Lego and the third installment in the Bionicle film series. It is largely a sequel to Bionicle 2: Legends of Metru Nui, with the majority of events taking place before that film's ending. Like Legends of Metru Nui, Web of Shadows is a prequel to the first film, Bionicle: Mask of Light. This is the first Bionicle film to not be given a rating by the MPAA. It was released on DVD on October 11, 2005 by Buena Vista Home Entertainment under the Miramax Home Entertainment label.

In the film, the Toa Metru return to their island city home of Metru Nui to rescue the Matoran populace whom they are sworn to protect; the Matoran all remain in a deep coma following the events of the previous film. Upon arrival, the Toa discover that the city has been overrun by spider-like creatures called Visorak, who capture the Toa and mutate them into beast-like creatures known as Hordika. The Toa Hordika work with a group of beings called Rahaga to find a way to revert to their original forms while remaining committed to their primary objective of rescuing the Matoran.

Plot 
Makuta, the Master of Shadows, is still frozen in his crystal prison following the events of the previous film. A mysterious figure calls out his name, then scratches the prison and extracts a shard from it. This figure is later revealed to be Roodaka, the queen of the Visorak horde, and she is later shown infusing the shard into her chest as she vows to free Makuta from his prison.

Vakama, as a Turaga, continues in voice-over the story of the Toa Metru. Having combined their elemental powers to seal the Makuta in protodermis at the end of the previous film, the Toa left Metru Nui to find a home for the sleeping Matoran, vowing to return to the city to rescue those they were forced to leave behind. However, in their absence, the city became overrun by the 'stealers of life', the Visorak horde.

The Toa Metru (Vakama, Nokama, Matau, Onewa, Whenua, and Nuju) arrive on the shore of Metru Nui and proceed towards the Coliseum where the Matoran are being held, observing the damage that has been dealt to the city. They are soon ambushed and captured by a group of Visorak and taken to the Coliseum, where they are infused with the Visorak's venom and mutated into beast-like creatures. Having been ordered to be killed by Sidorak, king of the Visorak horde, the Toa are sent falling to their deaths. They are saved by six flying beings who later introduce themselves as Rahaga, led by Norik.

Norik explains that the Visorak venom has transformed the Toa into Hordika, making them more susceptible to their bestial natures. As they will remain Hordika forever if the venom is not neutralized in time, their only hope of changing back lies in an ancient hermit-like Rahi named Keetongu, who is considered by many to be a myth. Vakama grows angry over continually being blamed for the Toa's current situation and storms off, choosing to try and save the Matoran alone. However, he is cornered by Visorak and once again taken to the Coliseum. Roodaka takes advantage of Vakama's current state of mind by offering him a proposal: if he commands the Visorak horde, he can rule Metru Nui. With his Hordika instinct overpowering his rational mind, Vakama accepts her offer.

The other Toa, along with the Rahaga, go to the Great Temple in the Ga-Metru district to search for clues to Keetongu's whereabouts. Vakama ambushes the Rahaga during the night, capturing five of them and leaving behind a badly injured Norik as a warning. He takes them to Sidorak, who grants Vakama a place as the general of the Visorak horde. Norik later informs the Toa of what Vakama has done, reiterating that they must find Keetongu before the Toa are completely consumed by their bestial states as Vakama has apparently been. Using inscriptions translated before the attack, the group follows a trail that leads them to Keetongu's lair at the top of the Ko-Metru district. Though reluctant at first, Keetongu eventually agrees to aid them.

The Toa return to the Coliseum and engage the Visorak. Matau confronts Vakama alone, while Keetongu goes after the king and queen. Roodaka orchestrates the death of Sidorak by leaving him to be killed by Keetongu. Matau tries to reason with Vakama as they fight each other; he apologizes for previously doubting Vakama's leadership and reminds Vakama of his duty as a Toa and his destiny to rescue the Matoran, eventually prompting Vakama to return to his senses.

Norik frees his fellow Rahaga and joins the Toa, but Roodaka arrives and demands control over the Toa's elemental powers. Vakama and Matau rejoin the rest of the team, with Vakama feigning continued allegiance to Roodaka. After the other five Toa unsuccessfully attempt to defeat Roodaka by firing their elemental spinner weapons at her, Vakama reveals his change of heart and orders the Visorak to leave and be free; having been placed under his command, the horde obeys. Unaware of her heartstone being carved from the same protodermis Makuta was sealed with (something Norik realises too late), Vakama then proceeds to fire his own spinner at Roodaka, incapacitating her and destroying the heartstone, uwittingly breaking the seal and setting Makuta free; the Master of Shadows uses his powers to teleport Roodaka to safety. Made fully aware of his actions by Norik, Vakama is nevertheless confident that they can stop him again. After Keetongu returns the Hordika to their Toa Metru forms, the Toa bid farewell to him and the Rahaga and depart Metru Nui with the comatose Matoran.

Following the events of the first film, Turaga Vakama concludes the story of the Toa Metru that he had been recounting to Takanuva, Jaller, and Hahli. As they leave, Vakama tells them that it is time for them to find their own destiny.

Cast and characters 
 Alessandro Juliani as Toa Vakama
 Christopher Gaze as Turaga Vakama (narrator)
 Brian Drummond as Toa Matau & Toa Onewa
 Tabitha St. Germain as Toa Nokama
 Paul Dobson as Toa Whenua & Sidorak
 Trevor Devall as Toa Nuju & Rahaga Iruini
 French Tickner as Rahaga Norik
 Kathleen Barr as Roodaka & Rahaga Gaaki
 Scott McNeil as Keetongu & Rahaga Bomonga

Production 
David Molina and Terry Shakespeare worked as Art Directors on the film in addition to directing, and Terry also worked as Visual Effects Supervisor.

Soundtrack 

Nathan Furst, who composed the music for the first two films, returned once more to compose Web of Shadows. His work on the film was praised by director David Molina who said that watching the movie with the music was an "amazing experience", making the story "suddenly alive and emotional". The soundtrack was released on December 22, 2017, twelve years after the film's release. It contains the complete score as it was written for the film and, like the other two soundtracks, is fully remastered.

The soundtrack includes Furst's original, unused sketch for Roodaka's theme as a bonus track. While the full theme is unused in the film itself in favor of a different motif associated with the character, hints of the sketch are present at various moments throughout the score and an alternate variation can be heard in the film's DVD menus.

 The film's end credits feature the song "Caught in a Dream" by All Insane Kids, one of the two songs they had written for the 2005 storyline.

Reception 
The film received mixed to positive reviews. The computer-generated effects were praised by some critics, stating that they could be appreciated even though the film was geared toward teenagers and young people. The DVD release was noted for its good quality audio and video but meager extras.

Bionicle 3 was nominated for the Golden Reel Award for Best Sound Editing in Direct to Video by the Motion Pictures Sound Editors, and the Annie Award for Best Home Entertainment Production.

References

External links 
 Official website
 

2005 films
2005 science fiction films
Bionicle
Bionicle (film series)
Lego films
Direct-to-video sequel films
2005 computer-animated films
Danish animated fantasy films
Danish animated science fiction films
Direct-to-video prequel films
Cyborg films
American science fiction action films
Miramax animated films
Toon Disney original programming
American animated science fiction films
American animated science fantasy films
2000s American animated films
2005 direct-to-video films
2000s children's animated films
Films set on fictional islands
Animated films about robots
Buena Vista Home Entertainment direct-to-video films
Films with screenplays by Henry Gilroy
2000s English-language films
American prequel films
Danish prequel films
Danish science fiction action films
Taiwanese science fiction action films